Peter Walker (born 20 August 1952) was an English cricketer. He was a left-handed batsman and right-arm medium-fast bowler who played for Devon. He was born in Stretford.

Walker, who played in the Minor Counties Championship for Devon between 1974 and 1978, made a single List A appearance for the team, during the 1978 Gillette Cup. From the lower-middle order, he scored 2 runs, and took figures of 0-40 from twelve overs of bowling.

In 1980, Walker played in the Minor Counties Championship for Bedfordshire.

External links
Peter Walker at Cricket Archive

1952 births
Living people
English cricketers
Devon cricketers
Bedfordshire cricketers